Sansui may refer to:

Sansui County, in Guizhou, China
Sansui Electric, Japanese manufacturer of audio and video equipment
Shan shui, 山水 in Chinese, mountain water, landscape scene
Sansui, 山水　in Japanese, landscape paintings